Advanced Warriors is an Interactive movie by British studio LightworX CGI Ltd. starring Jeremy Bulloch which was released in 2003.

Story
Advanced Warriors is set in a parallel universe, in which the planet Argonia exists in the same location as Earth. Argonia is invaded by a horde known as the Sirroms, and the planet's Guardian Force have to find a way to save it. In a last-ditch effort to save the planet, the Guardian opens a rift between Argonia and Earth, and selects four warriors from Earth's timeline, who have an inert DNA strand that marks them as potential saviours of Argonia. Manipulating the DNA of these four ordinary people, the Guardian is able to bring these planet-saving abilities to the surface, and turns them into the eponymous Advanced Warriors.

Cast
John Carrigan as Marshall
Rebecca Nichols as Rachel
Chase Masterson as Imogen
Jeremy Bulloch as Max
Mark Strickson as Guardian Force
Carolyn Sammons as Princess Tia
Darren Richards as Dark Mage
Geoff Large as Bullet
Wayne Pilbeam as The Giant
Tina Richards as The Siren
Tom Paterson as Darbok
Elfi Nussbaumer as Vampire Queen
Jen Maxter as Dysa
Claire Pawley as Forma
Justin Byman as Vampire Hunter Leader
Simon Gildare as Fighter Pilot

The Starhyke connection
Following the production of Advanced Warriors, cast members Jeremy Bulloch, Rebecca Nichols and Wayne Pilbeam would reunite in the cast of the British science fiction show Starhyke. Andrew Dymond, who wrote and directed Advanced Warriors, also wrote and directed Starhyke, while Sue Witheridge - the costume designer for Advanced Warriors would go on to play Daphne in Starhyke.

See also
Starhyke

References

External links

Advanced Warriors Yahoo! Group

DVD interactive technology
Interactive movie video games
Full motion video based games
Mobile games
2003 video games
Video games developed in the United Kingdom
Single-player video games